Collège Français is a French-language private Secondary school founded in 1959 and is located on Fairmount Avenue in the borough of Le Plateau-Mont-Royal in Montreal, Quebec, Canada.

See also
Collège Français (Longueuil)

References

External links

 Collège Français Official Website 

High schools in Montreal
Private schools in Quebec
Educational institutions established in 1959
Le Plateau-Mont-Royal
1959 establishments in Quebec